George Bruce may refer to:

George Bruce of Carnock (c. 1550–1625), Scottish engineer
George Bruce (industrialist) (1781–1866), Scottish-American inventor and businessman, awarded the first US design patent, for fonts
George Bruce (industrialist) (1781–1866), American industrialist and inventor
George Barclay Bruce (1821–1908), British civil engineer
George G. Bruce (1816–1884), American musician and music author
George Bruce (footballer) (1879–1928), Australian rules footballer
George A. Bruce (1839–1929), Massachusetts politician
George Bruce (writer) (1898–1974), Two Years Before the Mast (film)
George Bruce (poet) (1909–2002), Scottish poet
George Bruce (bishop) (born 1942), bishop of the Anglican Diocese of Ontario